Krompach is a municipality and village in Česká Lípa District in the Liberec Region of the Czech Republic. It has about 200 inhabitants.

Administrative parts
Villages of Juliovka and Valy are administrative parts of Krompach.

References

Villages in Česká Lípa District
Lusatian Mountains